Kremin is a Slavic-language surname literally meaning "flint". Notable people with this surname include: 

Barbara Kremen (1922–2022), American writer 
Claire Kremen, American conservation biologist
Gary Kremen (born 1963), American engineer, entrepreneur and public servant
Ilona Kremen (born 1994), Belarusian tennis player
Irwin Kremen (1925–2020), American artist 
Pete Kremen, American politician

See also
 
Kremen (disambiguation)
Kremin (disambiguation)